The Hall of Fame of the Bunyoro Kitara Kingdom is an honor that is bestowed upon persons who have done special and noteworthy work in the field of improving the Kingdom of Bunyoro Kitara.

Once a year, a board of persons nominated by the Omukama of Bunyoro meet and decide who (if any) are to be invited to join the Hall of Fame. The honor is not one that can be applied for; one must be chosen by the board, who decide purely on merit.

Currently the Hall of Fame is a purely written archive, but in the future it is meant to be created as a museum that consists of actual halls, displaying sculptures, plaques, and other memorabilia relating to the members.

References 

Orders, decorations, and medals of Bunyoro Kingdom
Awards established in 2010
Bunyoro-Kitara Kingdom